Álvaro González de Galdeano Aranzábal (born 3 January 1970) is a Spanish former professional cyclist. He was the manager of the cycling team  until it disbanded in 2013. He is the brother of Igor González de Galdeano.

Career
Galdeano began his career as a professional cyclist in 1992 with the Spanish team . He competed in the team time trial at the 1992 Summer Olympics.

In 1995, he joined  with his brother Igor.

He had his best season in 2000, when he won the Spanish National Road Race Championships, and a stage of the Vuelta a España and Giro d'Italia. He was to a suspended for three months when he was caught doping.

After putting an end to his cycling career, he became manager of the Basque team .

Major results

1994
 1st Stage 6 Vuelta a México
1996
 1st Stage 4 Vuelta a Asturias
 2nd Time trial, National Road Championships
1998
 1st Stage 2 Grand Prix Jornal de Noticias
 5th Overall Grand Prix du Midi Libre
 7th Overall Vuelta a España
1999
 1st Stage 1 Vuelta a Asturias
 3rd Time trial, National Road Championships
2000
 National Road Championships
1st  Road race
3rd Time trial
 1st Stage 17 Giro d'Italia
 1st Stage 15 Vuelta a España
2002
 1st Stage 4 (TTT) Tour de France
 2nd Overall Grand Prix du Midi Libre
 3rd Time trial, National Road Championships

Grand Tour general classification results timeline

References

External links

1970 births
Living people
Cyclists from the Basque Country (autonomous community)
Spanish Giro d'Italia stage winners
Spanish Vuelta a España stage winners
Doping cases in cycling
Cyclists at the 1992 Summer Olympics
Olympic cyclists of Spain
Sportspeople from Vitoria-Gasteiz